Mary Walters may refer to:
 Mary Coon Walters, American judge
 Mary Josephine Walters, American painter